Schmiedefeld is a village and (with the municipal section Taubenbach) a former municipality in the district Saalfeld-Rudolstadt, in Thuringia, Germany close to the Thuringian Rennsteig. Since 1 January 2019, it is part of the town Saalfeld. Before, it belonged to the municipal association Lichtetal am Rennsteig, which consisted of the municipalities Lichte, Piesau, Reichmannsdorf, and Schmiedefeld.

See also
 Municipal associations in Thuringia

Places of interest 
 The Morassina, a former mine with many stalactites

References

Former municipalities in Thuringia
Saalfeld-Rudolstadt